Maye is a Venezuelan-born American singer-songwriter.

Life
Maye was born in Caracas, and her family moved to Miami when she was young. Her father is Fernando Osorio, a prolific singer-songwriter in his own right, who won a Latin Grammy Award for Best Tropical Song in 2004.
She first started writing songs when she was eight. Her first songs were in English, but her father encouraged her to write in Spanish as well.

Career

Maye was on the songwriting team of Aitana's song "Nada Sale Mal", and was also part of the songwriting team of Aitana's debut album Spoiler. She and her father were also part of the songwriting effort behind Danny Ocean's song "Dime Tú", and she performed backing vocals as well.

In 2019, she released her first single, "My Love". The song features a switch in tempo at the chorus. This track helped her get her first deal with Warner Chappell Music.

Soon after, she released her second single, "Tú". The track has over 21 million streams on Spotify, and Barack Obama listed it as one of his favorite songs of summer 2020.

References

Year of birth missing (living people)
Living people
Latin pop singers
American singer-songwriters
Venezuelan emigrants to the United States
Spanish-language singers of the United States